The second cabinet of Martti Miettunen was the 58th government of Finland, which lasted from 30 November 1975 to 29 September 1976. It was a majority government formed by the Centre Party, the Social Democrats, the Finnish People's Democratic League, the Swedish People's Party, the Liberals, and some unaffiliated politicians. The cabinet's Prime Minister was Martti Miettunen.

Miettunen's cabinet had large economic problems to solve resulting from the aftershock of the 1973 oil crisis.

Ministers 

|}

References 

Miettunen 2
1975 establishments in Finland
1976 disestablishments in Finland
Cabinets established in 1975
Cabinets disestablished in 1976